Villarta-Quintana is a municipality and village in the province and autonomous community of La Rioja, Spain.

References

Municipalities in La Rioja (Spain)